Fraer Letitia Morrow (born 20 July 1998 in Doncaster) is an English weightlifter. She holds three British records at 55 kg and held two at 53 kg.
In October 2019 she took 2 silvers and 1 gold medal at the European U23 championships in Romania.

Major results

Junior results
 2017 European Junior Championships: 8th
 2017 World Junior Championships: 9th
 2016 European Junior Championships: 7th

References

External links
 
 
 

1998 births
Living people
Sportspeople from Doncaster
English female weightlifters
Weightlifters at the 2018 Commonwealth Games
Weightlifters at the 2022 Commonwealth Games
Commonwealth Games bronze medallists for England
Commonwealth Games medallists in weightlifting
21st-century English women
Medallists at the 2022 Commonwealth Games